Americare or AmeriCare may refer to 
 AmeriCares, non-profit disaster relief and global health organization
 Americare Companies founded by Elly Kleinman, health care services in New York
 Americare Group, part of NMC Health, healthcare business in Abu Dhabi
 Americare School of Nursing, part of Lincoln Tech, nursing schools in Fern Park and St. Petersburg, Florida 
 Americare Senior Living, also known as Americare Corporation, partnered with Sinclair School of Nursing, senior home services in Missouri 
 North AmeriCare, now known as Univera Healthcare, now part of Excellus, health insurance in New York
 North AmeriCare Park, now known as Sahlen Field, home of the minor league Buffalo Bisons, in Buffalo, New York